

The Bastrop County Courthouse is a historic courthouse built in 1883 at 803 Pine St, Bastrop, Texas. The Renaissance Revival style building was designed by Jasper N. Preston and F.E. Ruffini. It was added to the National Register of Historic Places on November 20, 1975.

Bastrop County was organized in 1837 and several houses served as early courthouses. A brick courthouse with a jail was built on the courthouse square in 1851 and used until it burned in 1883. The present courthouse was erected immediately after the fire. The courthouse is a three-story, stuccoed-brick  structure with a copper-domed clock tower in the center of a flat roof. Originally not stuccoed, it was added in a remodeling in 1924. Also at this time, the dome was lowered and various architectural details were removed, giving the building a Neoclassical look. The addition of a wing to the south of the original building occurred in 1953-1954. The Austin architectural firm of Page, Southerland, and Page designed the south wing.

The three-story tan and red brick old Bastrop County Jail, opened in 1892, also stands on the courthouse square. The jail was remodeled in 1925, including improvements to the ventilating, heating, and sewage systems. In 1971, a new jail and sheriff's office were built on the courthouse square immediately to the southeast of the courthouse. The building ceased to be a jail in 1974 and was converted to office space. The courthouse and jail were renovated again in 1990. The courthouse square in Bastrop is surrounded mostly by houses and a church as opposed to the commercial buildings that surround the typical Texas courthouse square.

The county jail was moved to a new sheriff's office complex a mile southeast of the courthouse, and an annex to the courthouse was added on the square and dedicated in 2004.

Gallery

Other
J.W. Preston & Son also designed the National Register-listed Bell County Courthouse in Belton, Texas.

See also

National Register of Historic Places listings in Bastrop County, Texas
Recorded Texas Historic Landmarks in Bastrop County
List of county courthouses in Texas

References

External links

County courthouses in Texas
National Register of Historic Places in Bastrop County, Texas
Buildings and structures in Bastrop County, Texas
Renaissance Revival architecture in Texas
Clock towers in Texas
Courthouses on the National Register of Historic Places in Texas
Jails on the National Register of Historic Places in Texas
Jails in Texas
Texas State Antiquities Landmarks
Recorded Texas Historic Landmarks
1883 establishments in Texas
Government buildings completed in 1883